James Crockett may refer to:
 James Crockett (soccer) (1910–1986), U.S. soccer center back
 James "Sonny" Crockett, a fictional character in NBC television series Miami Vice
 James Underwood Crockett (1915–1979), celebrity gardener and author
 Jim Crockett (1909–1973), American wrestling promoter
 Jim Crockett Jr. (1944–2021), American wrestling promoter